União Suzano Atlético Clube, or simply União Suzano, is a Brazilian football team based in Suzano, São Paulo. Founded in 1969, the team competes in Campeonato Paulista Série A3, the third tier of the São Paulo state football league.

The club was formerly known as Clube Atlético Paulista.

History
The club was founded on January 25, 1969 as Clube Atlético Paulista in Palmeiras neighborhood. The club's football department was professionalized in 1983, and the club was renamed to União Suzano Atlético Clube in 1989. They competed several times in the Campeonato Paulista Segunda Divisão.

Stadium
União Suzano Atlético Clube play their home games at Estádio Francisco Marques Figueira, nicknamed Suzanão. The stadium has a maximum capacity of 3,445 people.

References

Association football clubs established in 1969
Football clubs in São Paulo (state)
1969 establishments in Brazil